Stratford-on-Avon District Council elections are held every four years. Stratford-on-Avon District Council is the local authority for the non-metropolitan district of Stratford-on-Avon in Warwickshire, England. Since the last boundary changes in 2015, 36 councillors have been elected from 36 wards. Prior to 2015 elections were held three years out of every four, with a third of the council elected each time.

Political control
The first election to the council was held in 1973, initially operating as a shadow authority before coming into its powers on 1 April 1974. Since 1974 political control of the council has been held by the following parties:

Leadership
The leaders of the council since 2000 have been:

Council elections
1973 Stratford-on-Avon District Council election
1976 Stratford-on-Avon District Council election
1979 Stratford-on-Avon District Council election (New ward boundaries)
1980 Stratford-on-Avon District Council election
1982 Stratford-on-Avon District Council election
1983 Stratford-on-Avon District Council election
1984 Stratford-on-Avon District Council election
1986 Stratford-on-Avon District Council election
1987 Stratford-on-Avon District Council election
1988 Stratford-on-Avon District Council election
1990 Stratford-on-Avon District Council election
1991 Stratford-on-Avon District Council election
1992 Stratford-on-Avon District Council election 
1994 Stratford-on-Avon District Council election (District boundary changes took place but the number of seats remained the same)
1995 Stratford-on-Avon District Council election
1996 Stratford-on-Avon District Council election
1998 Stratford-on-Avon District Council election
1999 Stratford-on-Avon District Council election
2000 Stratford-on-Avon District Council election
2002 Stratford-on-Avon District Council election (New ward boundaries reduced the number of seats by 2)
2003 Stratford-on-Avon District Council election
2004 Stratford-on-Avon District Council election
2006 Stratford-on-Avon District Council election
2007 Stratford-on-Avon District Council election
2008 Stratford-on-Avon District Council election (Some new ward boundaries)
2010 Stratford-on-Avon District Council election
2011 Stratford-on-Avon District Council election
2012 Stratford-on-Avon District Council election
2014 Stratford-on-Avon District Council election
2015 Stratford-on-Avon District Council election (New ward boundaries)
2019 Stratford-on-Avon District Council election

District result maps

By-election results

1993-1997

1997-2001

2001-2005

2005-2009

2009-2013

2013-present

The by-election was caused by the resignation of Councillor Nick Moon, who was elected as a Conservative. However, Moon changed his mind and contested the election as an Independent, receiving 5.8% of the vote

References

By-election results

External links
Stratford-on-Avon District Council

 
Council elections in Warwickshire
Stratford-on-Avon District
Politics of Stratford-upon-Avon
District council elections in England